Matters At All is the second single to be taken from Welsh Rock band Kids In Glass Houses second album Dirt. The single was released on 29 January 2010, and has so far managed to reach a peak of #65 on the UK Singles Chart and #1 on the UK Rock Chart. The song also managed to receive placement on BBC Radio 1's A Playlist

The Song

When asked about the track, Aled Philips (Vocals) explains: 
The song ‘Matters At All’ is about making things happen. It plays on the idea of having your time and making the most of it. A lot of the songs on the new album are about just playing what you're dealt and making the most of a good or bad situation.’ He continues; ‘With the speed that things move nowadays and people's short attention span, I was always weary of us staying relevant and doing something better than we did before, and curious as to whether people would stick by us. It's an age old theme that I guess every band goes through at some point. Except for AC/DC. They can just keep doing their thing...

Music video

Track listing

Digital Download

Chart performance

After receiving strong radio airplay throughout February and March 2010, "Matters At All" debuted on the UK Singles Chart at #70 on 28 March 2010. The following week, on 4 April 2010, the single climbed 5 places to a current peak of #65, before falling to #76 the following week. The single also managed to reach a peak of #1 on the UK Rock Chart, which is a first for the band. It spent a week at the top spot before falling to #2 following the entry of Paramore's The Only Exception.

References

2010 singles
2010 songs
Songs written by Jason Perry (singer)
Roadrunner Records singles
Kids in Glass Houses songs